Pseudagrion glaucescens is a species of damselfly in the family Coenagrionidae. It is found in Angola, Benin, Botswana, Burkina Faso, Cameroon, Chad, Ivory Coast, Gambia, Ghana, Guinea, Kenya, Liberia, Malawi, Mozambique, Namibia, Nigeria, Senegal, Sierra Leone, Tanzania, Togo, Uganda, Zambia, Zimbabwe, and possibly Burundi. Its natural habitats are dry savanna, moist savanna, subtropical or tropical dry shrubland, subtropical or tropical moist shrubland, and rivers.

References

Coenagrionidae
Insects described in 1876
Taxonomy articles created by Polbot